Carwardine is an English surname, originally given to people from Carden, Cheshire. Notable people with the surname include:
 Anthony Carwardine (born 1938), Australian naval officer
 George Carwardine (1887–1947), designer known for the Anglepoise lamp
 Mark Carwardine (born 1959), British zoologist
 Penelope Carwardine (c.1730–1804), English miniature painter, married name Penelope Butler
 Richard Carwardine (born 1947), Welsh historian

References

English-language surnames
Toponymic surnames